Krisztina Bárány (born 24 January 1994 in Győr) is a Hungarian handballer.

References

External links 
 Krisztina Bárány player profile on Győri Audi ETO KC Official Website
 Krisztina Bárány career statistics at Worldhandball

1994 births
Living people
Sportspeople from Győr
Hungarian female handball players
Győri Audi ETO KC players